Aelius Everhardus Vorstius (26 September 1565 – 22 October 1624) was a Dutch physician, botanist and university professor at Leiden University from 1598 to 1624.

Born in Roermond and studied and traveled to Dordrecht, Leiden, Heidelberg, Cologne, Padua, Bologna, Ferrara, and Naples before returning to work in Delft, then Leiden where he became Director of the botanical garden. His son, Adolphus Vorst (or Vorstius) was also a prominent physician who also became professor of medicine at Leiden. He died in Leiden.

1565 births
1624 deaths
16th-century Dutch botanists
Dutch anatomists
16th-century Dutch anatomists
Leiden University alumni
Heidelberg University alumni
University of Cologne alumni
University of Padua alumni
University of Bologna alumni
University of Ferrara alumni
Academic staff of Leiden University
16th-century Dutch people
Pre-Linnaean botanists